The Netphone 701 is a phone marketed and produced by Smart Communications. It was launched in 2011 at the GSMA Mobile World Congress.

Specifications

Hardware 
The Netphone's body is mostly plastic with a matte finish, while the screen is made out of glass. It has an LCD display with a resolution of 480x800. A micro-USB port is used for charging, while a headphone jack is also available.

Software 
The phone ships with Android 2.2 out of the box. It cannot be updated to future versions of Android.

SmartNet 
SmartNet is composed of widgets and apps developed by Smart: Smart Inbox, IM, Social Stream, Real-time Balance, and Smart Center. There is also a Global Directory, which lists all Netphone users. The Global Directory can be used to help find friends and add them to the user's contact list. Since the directory has no moderation, some users are anonymous.

References 

Android (operating system) devices
Mobile phones introduced in 2011